Bauria may refer to:

Bauria, an extinct genus of reptiles
Bauria people, an ethnic group of India
Bauria language, a language of India
Bauria railway station, in Kolkata, India